A gravity battery is a type of electricity storage device that stores gravitational energy, the energy stored in an object resulting from a change in height due to gravity, also called potential energy. A gravity battery works by using excess energy from the grid to raise a mass to generate gravitational potential energy, which is then dropped to convert potential energy into electricity through an electric generator. Energy generated from a gravity battery is a form of sustainable energy. One form of a gravity battery is one that lowers a mass, such as a block of concrete, to generate electricity. The most common gravity battery is used in pumped-storage hydroelectricity, where water is pumped to higher elevations to store energy and released through water turbines to generate electricity.

Development 
The earliest form of a device that used gravity to power mechanical movement was the pendulum clock, invented in 1656 by Christiaan Huygens. The clock was powered by the force of gravity using an escapement mechanism, that made a pendulum move back and forth. Since then, gravity batteries have advanced into systems that can harness the power of gravity and turn it into electricity for large scale energy storage.

The first gravity based pumped-storage hydroelectricity (PSH) system was developed in 1907 in Switzerland. In 1930, pumped-storage came to the United States by the Connecticut Electric and Power Company. As of 2019, the total world capacity for PSH is 168 GW (gigawatts). The United States has 23 GW capacity from PSH, accounting for nearly 2% of the energy supply system and 95% of utility-scale energy storage in the US. Gravity based pumped-storage electricity is currently the largest form of grid energy storage in the world.

In 2012, Martin Riddiford and Jim Reeves developed the first functioning prototype of GravityLight, a small-scale gravity battery that is now commercially available in certain countries.

Energy Vault, a Swiss company founded in 2017, stores electricity using a crane that raises and lowers blocks of concrete. In late 2020, a prototype built in Arbedo-Castione used six cranes on a 110-meter-high tower to move 35-ton concrete blocks with a capacity of 80 megawatt hours.

Gravitricity, founded in 2011 by Peter Fraenkel, built a 15-meter 250-kilowatt gravity battery prototype near Edinburgh, Scotland that started trial operations and grid-connection in April 2021.

Mechanisms and parts 
Gravity batteries can have different designs and structures, but all gravity batteries use the same properties of physics to generate energy. Gravitational potential energy is the work required to move an object in the opposite direction of Earth's gravity, expressed by the equation

where U is gravitational potential energy, m is the mass of the object, g is the acceleration of the object due to gravity (9.8 m/s2 on earth), and h is the height of the object. Using the work-energy principle, the total amount of energy generated can be expressed by the equation

where E is the total amount of energy generated and h1 and h2 represent the initial and final heights of an object. The change of energy directly correlates to the vertical displacement of a mass; the higher a mass is lifted, the more gravitational potential energy is stored. The change in energy also directly correlates to the mass of an object; the heavier the mass, the bigger the change in energy.

In a gravity battery, a mass is displaced, or lifted, to generate gravitational potential energy that is transformed into electricity. Gravity batteries store gravitational potential energy by lifting a mass to a certain height using a pump, crane, or motor. After the mass is lifted, it now stores a certain gravitational potential energy based on the mass of the object and how high it was lifted. The stored gravitational potential energy is then transferred into electricity. The mass is lowered to fall back to its original height, which causes a generator to spin and create electricity.

Types of gravity batteries

Large scale
Pumped-storage hydroelectricity (PSH) is the most widely used and highest-capacity form of grid-energy storage. In PSH, water is pumped from a lower reservoir to a higher reservoir, which can then be released through turbines to create energy. An alternative PSH proposal uses a  proprietary high-density liquid,  times denser than water, which requires a smaller head (elevation) and thus decreases the size and cost of the necessary infrastructure.

Energy-storage-by-rail is a concept where excess renewable energy is used to run heavy train cars uphill during times of low energy demand.  The potential energy is released later by using regenerative braking as they roll downhill, acting as a gravity battery. A utility-scale (50 MW) facility called GravityLine began construction in October 2020 by Advanced Rail Energy Storage, located at the Gamebird Pit gravel mine in the Pahrump Valley, Nevada, and is planned to deliver up to 15 minutes of service at full capacity.

Lift Renewable Energy uses a form of gravity battery. To store energy, buoyant gas containers are pulled down into water by a winch, water is in effect lifted hundreds of meters. The cycle is then reversed and electricity is generated as the gas containers rise.  Relatively little infrastructure is required, the batteries can be sited near major population centers, round trip efficiency is 85+%, and the system can be built at a GWh scale.

Lifted Weight Storage (LWS) technology uses surplus energy to mechanically lift solid weights vertically, typically on a pulley system. When extra energy is needed, the mass is lowered, and the pulley turns a generator. 

EnergyVault is designing a LWS system using a tower built from 32-ton concrete blocks, stacked with 120-meter cranes. One commercial unit is expected to store 20 MWh of energy, or enough to power 2,000 Swiss homes a day.

Gravitricity's LWS system in an underground shaft uses an electric winch to lift a 500-to-5000-tonne weight, which when lowered turns the winch motor as a generator. The system generates 10 MWh, enough to power 13,000 homes for two hours. The weight can also be dropped quickly for a small burst of power.

Small scale
GravityLight is a small gravity-powered light that operates by manually lifting a bag of rocks or sand up and then letting it fall by itself to generate energy. It is designed as an alternative for those who do not have access to electricity and typically rely on kerosene lamps, which are expensive, dangerous, and polluting.

Economics and efficiency 
Cost of gravity batteries varies by design.

Pumped storage hydropower costs $165/kWh to operate, with a levelized cost of storage (LCOS), of $0.17/kWh. The pumps and turbines of PSH systems operate at up to 90% efficiency.

Gravitricity's 250 kW demonstrator is expected to be $1.25 million, promising a 50-year lifespan and efficiency of 80–90%. A 2018 comparative review of the proposition was favorable considering the extended lifespan and power-to-energy cost ratio.

Gravity batteries can make solar and wind more viable as they can store the excess energy they make during peak hours and distribute it later when needed.

Environmental impacts 
Gravity batteries are designed to be paired with renewable energy solutions whose sources (sunlight, wind, etc) are frequently variable and do not necessarily coincide with demand.  It is hoped that they will have a better long term cost than chemical batteries, while having fewer environmental issues than other traditional storage solutions such as pumped-water storage.  It is anticipated that gravity battery systems will be able to quickly provide power during peak consumption which may allow them to supplement or replace fossil fuel peaking power plants.  Single weight systems are expected to be able to achieve full power generation in less than a second.

Among low-carbon long-duration energy storage methods, pumped storage hydropower had the lowest current energy cost, though lithium-ion batteries are expected to overtake it in the future. Pumped storage hydropower and other long-duration storage methods are considered to have low environmental and security risks compared to battery technology, with the only limiting factor being geology.

Gravity (chemical) battery 

From 1870 to 1930, the term "gravity battery" was used to describe a collection of popular battery types where gravity was used to keep the chemical constituents separate based on their respective densities.

References

Energy storage
Swiss inventions
Scottish inventions